Stephanie Santer (born 1981) is an Italian cross-country skier.

She competed at the 2000 and 2001 Junior World Championships, managing a 16th place at best. Competing at the 2001, 2003 and 2009 Winter Universiade, she managed three top-10 placements at the latter championship, one of which in the relay.

She made her World Cup debut in December 2001 in Cogne, finishing a measly 77th, but broke the top 30-barrier in December 2005 in Nové Město na Moravě. Her career highlight was a 31st place in the 30 kilometres event at the 2007 Nordic World Ski Championships.

She represented the sports club ASC Toblach.

References 

1981 births
Living people
People from Toblach
Italian female cross-country skiers
Sportspeople from Südtirol